Paulette Sullivan Moore is Delaware’s first African American female lawyer.

She completed her legal education at Rutgers University Law School (1976). In 1977, Moore became the first African American female admitted to practice law in Delaware. In the same year, she was admitted to practice before Delaware's U.S. District Court and the Third Circuit of the U.S. Court of Appeals. During the 1990s, Moore served as the New Castle County Recorder of Deeds. She has worked as a Policy Coordinator for the Delaware Coalition Against Domestic Violence and the Vice President of Public Policy of the National Network to End Domestic Violence.

See also 
List of first women lawyers and judges in Delaware

References 

Delaware lawyers
20th-century American women lawyers
20th-century American lawyers
African-American lawyers
African-American women lawyers
Rutgers University alumni
Year of birth missing (living people)
Living people
21st-century African-American women